The Auburn Formation is a geologic formation in Kansas. It preserves fossils from the upper Carboniferous Period.

See also

 List of fossiliferous stratigraphic units in Kansas
 Paleontology in Kansas

References
 

Carboniferous Kansas